Roman Pakholyuk (born 3 October 1979) is a Ukrainian retired football forward.

Career
Pakholyuk became the highest scorer along with Oleksandr Aliyev (Dynamo-2 Kyiv) when he scored 16 goals for FC Nyva Vinnytsia during the 2004–05 Ukrainian First League season. Between 2008 and 2013 he played in the Kazakhstan Premier League for various clubs and attained Kazakhstani citizenship.

In 2001 he played one game against Yugoslavian youth team.

External links
 
 Pakholyuk at Odessa Football
 

1979 births
Living people
Ukrainian footballers
Piddubny Olympic College alumni
Kazakhstani footballers
Ukrainian Premier League players
FC Arsenal Kyiv players
FC CSKA Kyiv players
FC Systema-Boreks Borodianka players
FC Chornomorets Odesa players
FC Chornomorets-2 Odesa players
MFC Mykolaiv players
FC Nyva Vinnytsia players
FC Dnipro Cherkasy players
Ukrainian expatriate footballers
Expatriate footballers in Kazakhstan
Ukrainian expatriate sportspeople in Kazakhstan
Kazakhstan Premier League players
Naturalised citizens of Kazakhstan
FC Ordabasy players
FC Astana players
FC Kaisar players
FC Taraz players
FC Atyrau players
Association football forwards
Sportspeople from Zhytomyr Oblast